Var Jafari-ye Gachi (also Romanized as Vār Ja‘farī-ye Gachī; also known as Vār Ja‘farī) is a village in Doshman Ziari Rural District, in the Central District of Kohgiluyeh County, Kohgiluyeh and Boyer-Ahmad Province, Iran. At the 2006 census, its population was 36, in 6 families.

References 

Populated places in Kohgiluyeh County